Miłoradz  is a village in Malbork County, Pomeranian Voivodeship, in northern Poland. It is the seat of the gmina (administrative district) called Gmina Miłoradz.

Before 1772 the area was part of Kingdom of Poland, 1772-1919 Prussia and Germany, 1920-1939 Free City of Danzig, September 1939 - February 1945 Nazi Germany. In 1945 it returned to Poland. For the history of the region, see History of Pomerania.

The village has a population of 3,397.

References

Villages in Malbork County